M. K. Mustafa (died 14 August 1992) was an Indian actor who appeared in Tamil-language films. He appeared in many films in 1940 to around 1972, and he was a close friend of M. G. Ramachandran.

Filmography 
 Kanjan as Loganathan
 Abhimanyu as Karnan
 Marmayogi
 Kaithi as Inspector Kesavan
 Rani
 Needhipathi
 Naane Raja
 Yaar Paiyyan as Kumar
 Sivagangai Seemai as Chinna Maruthu
 Thirudathe as Raju
 Parisu as Ragu
 Ezhai Pangalan
 Veera Abhimanyu as Dronan
 Thazampoo
 Chinnanchiru Ulagam
 Thayin Madiyil
 Harichandra as Minister
 Thayin Mel Aanai
 Sange Muzhangu
 Rickshakaran
 Snehithi

Reference 

20th-century Indian actors
Indian male actors
Actors in Tamil cinema